The 1879 City of Dunedin by-election was a by-election held  on 15 July 1879 in the  electorate in Dunedin during the 6th New Zealand Parliament.

The by-election was caused by the resignation of the incumbent, Robert Stout.

The winner of the by-election was William Downie Stewart Sr.

His opponent Charles Reeves "got the Catholic block vote" and religion in education was a factor in several by-elections in 1879 (e.g. in Auckland and Nelson).

Results

References 

 

Dunedin 1879
1879 elections in New Zealand
April 1874 events
Politics of Dunedin
1870s in Dunedin